Hanne Gråhns (born 29 August 1992) is a Swedish former football midfielder who played for KIF Örebro DFF.

At the 2016 Summer Olympics Gråhns was an alternate for the Sweden national team, who came second in the tournament.

When Örebro suffered a shock relegation from the Damallsvenskan in 2017, Gråhns remained loyal to the club. She retired from football after captaining the team to promotion in 2018.

Honours 
Sweden U19
Winner
 UEFA Women's Under-19 Championship: 2012

References

External links 

 
 
 Profile at Swedish Football Association (SvFF) 

1994 births
Living people
Swedish women's footballers
Linköpings FC players
IFK Norrköping players
KIF Örebro DFF players
Damallsvenskan players
Women's association football defenders
Olympic footballers of Sweden
Medalists at the 2016 Summer Olympics
Olympic silver medalists for Sweden
Olympic medalists in football
Sweden women's international footballers
Footballers at the 2016 Summer Olympics